Our House may refer to:

Film and television
 Our House (2003 film) or Duplex, an American film by Danny DeVito
 Our House (2006 film), a television movie starring Doris Roberts
 Our House (2018 film), an American-Canadian-German film by Anthony Scott Burns
 Our House (1960 TV series), a British sitcom starring Hattie Jacques
 Our House (Australian TV series), an Australian lifestyle/DIY program
 Our House (1996 TV series), a British DIY television programme
 Our House (American TV series), a 1986–1988 American drama television series that aired on NBC
 "Our House" (Degrassi: The Next Generation), an episode of Degrassi: The Next Generation
 Our House, the cover show for the British children's game show Hider in the House
 Our House (2022), television series on ITV, starring Tuppence Middleton, Martin Compston and Rupert Penry-Jones

Music
 Our House (band), an Australian band
 "Our House" (Crosby, Stills, Nash & Young song) (1970)
 "Our House" (Madness song) (1982)
 Our House (musical), a 2002 musical based on the songs of Madness
 Our House: The Original Songs, a 2002 greatest hits album by Madness, and the soundtrack to the musical

Other uses
 Our House (Gallipolis, Ohio), a National Register of Historic Places listing in Gallia County, Ohio
 Our House, a 2009 play by Theresa Rebeck

See also
 Our Place (disambiguation)